Harold Harding Booth (4 August 1886 – 22 July 1964) was an  Australian rules footballer who played with St Kilda in the Victorian Football League (VFL).

Notes

External links 

1886 births
1964 deaths
Australian rules footballers from Melbourne
St Kilda Football Club players
People from Collingwood, Victoria